Radical 116 or radical cave meaning "cave" is one of the 23 Kangxi radicals (214 radicals in total) composed of 5 strokes.

In the Kangxi Dictionary, there are 298 characters (out of 49,030) to be found under this radical.

 is also the 117th indexing component in the Table of Indexing Chinese Character Components predominantly adopted by Simplified Chinese dictionaries published in mainland China.

Evolution

Derived characters

Variant forms
This radical character takes different forms in different languages. In Japanese and Korean hanja, when used as an upper component, the last stroke of the radical character is a vertical-curve-hook stroke . In Traditional Chinese used in Taiwan and Hong Kong, its last stroke is a vertical-curve-horizontal stroke . In Mainland China's xin zixing, it is a rightward dot.

Literature

External links

Unihan Database - U+7A74

116
117